Nikah Halala (English Title:The Interim Husband; Persian title: Mohallel) is a 1971 Iranian Persian-language romance comedy directed by Nosrat Karimi and starring Karimi, Irene Zazians, Reza Karam Rezaei, Rouholah Mofidi, Gholamhoseein Mofidi, and Akhtar Karimi Zand (Diana).

The film is about the controversial practice of Nikah halala.

Plot
After divorcing his wife in rage due to a misunderstanding, a man wishes to reunite with her only to find out that the divorce office clerk by mistake has registered their divorce as irreversible. Now he has to find someone incapable of sexual intercourse to marry her and consummate the union and divorce her, as dictated by Nikah halala, so the first husband can marry her again.

Cast
Nosrat Karimi
Irene Zazians
Reza Karam Rezaei
Rouholah Mofidi
Gholamhoseein Mofidi
Akhtar Karimi Zand (Diana)

References

External links
 
 Mohallel The Interim Husband at Farsi Land

1971 films
1971 romantic comedy films
1970s Persian-language films
Iranian romantic comedy films
Iranian black-and-white films